The Bentley S1 (originally simply "Bentley S") was a luxury car produced by Bentley Motors Limited from 1955 until 1959. The S1 was derived from Rolls-Royce's complete redesign of its standard production car after World War II, the Silver Cloud. Each was its maker's last standard production car with an independent chassis. The S-series Bentley was given the Rolls-Royce - Bentley L Series V8 engine in late 1959 and named the S2. Twin headlamps and a facelift to the front arrived in late 1962, resulting in the S3. In late 1965, the S3 was replaced by the new unitary construction Rolls-Royce Silver Shadow-derived T series.

Bentley standard steel saloon
The car was announced at the end of April 1955, and it was noted that the existing Continental model would continue. The new standard steel saloon replaced the R type standard steel saloon which had been in production, with modifications, since 1946. It was a more  generously sized five- or six-seater saloon, with the body manufactured in pressed steel with stressed skin construction. Doors, bonnet [hood] and luggage locker lid [trunk lid] were of aluminium.

Having a totally new external appearance, although with the traditional radiator grille, the main differences from the R type were:
 three inches longer wheelbase
 lower build without reducing headroom and with an enlarged luggage boot [trunk]
 softer suspension with electrically operated control of rear dampers
 lighter steering and improved braking
 engine capacity increased to 4887cc, the same size as used in the Bentley Continental
 four-speed automatic gearbox was standard, with ability to select individual ratios if desired.

Standard and long wheelbase saloon and chassis
As with the preceding Mark VI and R type Bentleys, there was almost no difference between standard Bentley and Rolls-Royce models; this Bentley S differing only in its radiator grille shape and badging from the Rolls-Royce Silver Cloud I.

The models shared the 4.9 L (4887 cc/298 in³) straight-6 engine. They were the last vehicles to be powered by descendants of the engine originally used in the Rolls-Royce Twenty from 1922 to 1929. Twin SU carburetors were fitted, with upgraded models from 1957. A 4-speed automatic transmission was standard.

Two wheelbases were produced:  and, from 1957, .

The test car, which had the optional power steering, cost £6305 including taxes of £1803.

Production
 S: 3072 (145 with coachbuilt bodies)
 S long wheelbase: 35 (12 with coachbuilt bodies)

S Continental

A high-performance version S Continental (chassis only) was introduced six months after the introduction of the S1. Lighter weight fixed-head and drophead coupé bodies were provided to special order (for a premium of about 50%) by H. J. Mulliner & Co., Park Ward, James Young and Freestone & Webb. A pre-production 2-seater fixed-head coupé on the new chassis was designed and built for the Bentley factory by Pininfarina. In 1959, motoring correspondent Archie Vicar described it as a "comfortable large saloon with a decent turn of speed".

Production
 S Continental: 431

References

S1
Sedans
Coupés
Rear-wheel-drive vehicles
Cars introduced in 1955